The Birmingham & District Premier Cricket League is the oldest club cricket league in the United Kingdom, formed in 1888. It was the first ECB Premier League, being designated such in 1998, and is one of the strongest of the ECB Premier Leagues.

Geography 
The Birmingham League traditionally covered North Worcestershire, South Staffordshire and North Warwickshire, much of which is now the conurbation of the West Midlands. Since 1998, with the introduction of the ECB Premier Leagues, the pyramid system, and feeder leagues in the four counties (Shropshire Premier Cricket League, Staffordshire Club Cricket Championship, Warwickshire Cricket League and Worcestershire County Cricket League), the catchment of the league has spread to include the whole of Shropshire, Worcestershire and Warwickshire, as well as a large part of Staffordshire, although North Staffordshire clubs play in the North Staffordshire and South Cheshire League. Herefordshire clubs, who play in the Worcestershire County Cricket League, can also be promoted into the league.

History 
The Birmingham and District Cricket League is the oldest club competition in the United Kingdom, beginning league matches in 1888. The Birmingham and District Cricket Association had actually formed eight years earlier in 1880, but only ran a successful, if not controversial, cup competition for those first few years.
On Friday 30 November 1888, representatives from local cricket clubs gathered at the Queen's Arms Hotel, Easy Row, Birmingham and went about setting up the first Club Cricket League in the UK, being inspired by the success The Birmingham County Football Association had had in organising local football competition and fixtures.
With some representatives needing to consult their own committees before pledging their commitment to the league, and one or two prominent local clubs not being present, it was not until a second meeting on Friday 14 December 1888 that the league was actually, officially formed. There were initially seven clubs who decided to trial the league format the following season. They were:
 Aston Unity
 Handsworth Wood
 Kings Heath
 Mitchells
 Salters
 Walsall
 West Bromwich Dartmouth

Those early days saw many changes in the league's club make-up:
Kings Heath moved to "The Reddings" Ground, joining with Moseley Cricket Club (and taking on that name). Another Kings Heath Club was formed later, but never became part of the Birmingham League set-up until the restructuring of Midlands Club cricket in 1998.
Salters Cricket Club who played in Roebuck Lane, West Bromwich, and originated from the Spring Works of the same name, resigned from the league after just one season.
In 1890, Wednesbury Cricket Club joined the league.
In 1891, Smethwick Cricket Club, who had been involved in the Birmingham and District Cricket Association Cup competition in the 1880s, entered the league.
Mitchells Cricket Club left the league between 1892 and 1896, due to some friction surrounding ineligible players, but shortly after they returned, they became Mitchells and Butlers Cricket Club when the two breweries amalgamated in 1898.
In 1892, Small Heath Cricket Club joined the league and although their ground was amongst the best in the competition, the club was out of its depth in other aspects, and they resigned from the league 3 years later.
In 1894, Warwickshire County Cricket Club entered the league after years of deliberation, but withdrew again in 1895 after being admitted to the County Championship.
Over the next few years, the league's influence moved to the west, with Dudley Cricket Club joining the League in 1893, Stourbridge in 1894 and Kidderminster in 1895.
Handsworth Wood who had performed creditably in the league until their Browne's Green ground was acquired by developers shortly after the First World War, spent one season playing at the County Ground, Edgbaston, but when no new ground could be found the following season either, they lost a narrow motion by the league (by one vote), and Old Hill Cricket Club replaced them in 1920. The Handsworth Wood Club folded shortly afterwards, handing their cash balance over to the league benevolent fund.

The second XI competition, perhaps stronger than any of the lower level 1st XI competitions which existed in the region until the restructuring of 1998, was formed in 1893.
The league was suspended for the First World War between 1914 and 1918, but continued to play through the Second World War, and the League, now comprising 10 clubs (Aston Unity, Dudley, Kidderminster, Mitchells and Butlers, Moseley, Old Hill, Smethwick, Stourbridge, Walsall, West Bromwich Dartmouth), stayed the same until 1975.
In 1975, the league expanded again as Warwickshire and Worcestershire decided the strength of the league could be utilised. Warwickshire entered a 1st and 2nd XI (basically a 1st/2nd team side and a 2nd/colts side), whilst Worcestershire only entered a 1st XI and Duport Cricket Club (A Dudley-based Furniture making company club) played their 2nd XI fixtures.
Whilst Warwickshire established themselves in the competition and won it on a few occasions, Worcestershire struggled, and two years later, Duport took on their 1st XI fixtures too, as they were forced to pull out of the league.
Duport also struggled with the on-field standards, and when support from the company's Social Club was reduced they too were forced to pull out of the competition, and were replaced by another Worcester-based side in 1982, Worcester City.
Many other changes took place in the league throughout the 1980s and 1990s, and they are summarised below:

In 1998 the Birmingham League included Promotion & relegation for the first time. The 12 teams of the Birmingham League formed the Premier Division, The 2 other big leagues (Midlands Combined Counties League & Midlands Club Cricket League) formed the lower divisions. Teams increased over time to 48 (4 1st XI divisions of 12 clubs: Premier, Division 1, Division 2 and Division 3, with accompanying 2nd XI divisions: Premier, Division 1, Division 2 West and Division 2 East). In 2017, under pressure from the ECB, the league's clubs voted to cut the league down to 2 divisions of 12 by 2019, and disband the 2nd XI competition.

ECB Premier League 
Since being designated an ECB Premier League in 1998 (the first Premier Cricket League in the Country), several changes have occurred in the league's structure.
Initially, the 12 clubs in the old Birmingham League made up the Premier Division, and a First Division, Second Division East and Second Division West were made up from clubs in the old Midlands Combined Counties League, the Worcestershire League, the Warwickshire League and the Staffs League.  The Second Division East and Second Division West were later replaced by a Second Division and a Third Division.

Only one club was promoted in the first year of the new structure, which was Cannock while Aston Unity, a founder member of the league, were the first club to be relegated.  Since 1999, two clubs have been relegated and two promoted each season.

Following the 2018 season the Second and Third divisions were abolished, along with all four 2nd XI divisions, and the league was reduced to two divisions.  The relegated 1st and 2nd XIs now compete in the four West Midland county feeder leagues.

The winners of the four feeder leagues now enter a ‘round robin’ playoff at the end of each season with the top two teams being promoted (replacing the two relegated sides from Premier Division Two) and the bottom two going back to their feeder leagues.

The 2020 competition was cancelled because of the COVID-19 pandemic.  A replacement competition was arranged for the later part of the season when cricket again became possible, but with its winners not to be regarded as official league champions.

Clubs for 2022 
For the 2022 season, the clubs in Premier Division One are: Barnt Green, Berkswell, Halesowen, Kenilworth Wardens, Kidderminster, Knowle & Dorridge, Leamington Spa, Moseley, Ombersley, Shifnal, Shrewsbury, Smethwick.

The clubs in Premier Division Two are: Barnards Green, Bridgnorth, Bromsgrove, Dorridge, Harborne, Himley, Lichfield, Walsall, Wem, West Bromwich Dartmouth, Wolverhampton, Worfield.

Across the two divisions, the league currently includes:

7 Warwickshire clubs (Berkswell, Dorridge, Harborne, Kenilworth Wardens, Knowle & Dorridge, Leamington Spa, Moseley)

6 Staffordshire clubs (Himley, Lichfield, Smethwick, Walsall, West Bromwich Dartmouth, Wolverhampton)

6 Worcestershire clubs (Barnards Green, Barnt Green, Bromsgrove, Halesowen, Kidderminster, Ombersley)

5 Shropshire clubs (Bridgnorth, Shifnal, Shrewsbury, Wem, Worfield).

Winners

 

 * – denotes a shared title

Championships won

Performance by season from 1998

1000 runs in a season 
Although there have been many notable feats throughout the league's history, one of the most difficult achievements for a batsman is to score over 1000 runs in a club league season. Only fourteen players have ever managed it in the top division of the Birmingham League, one of them twice:

National Knockout 
The Birmingham and District Cricket League's strength as a competition has been proven throughout the years, by the presence of its clubs in the latter stages of the ECB National Club Cricket Championship (a cup Competition for all Clubs in the UK).
Here are a list of clubs in the league structure who have won or been runners-up in the competition:

Famous players, and B&DPCL Club(s) represented 
Many well known international players have played in the Birmingham League over the years:

England Players

 Tom Banton Barnt Green
 Kabir Ali Smethwick, West Bromwich Dartmouth, C & R Hawks
 Moeen Ali Smethwick, West Bromwich Dartmouth, Wolverhampton,
 Dennis Amiss
 Ted Arnold
 Sydney Barnes
 Charles Barnett
 Ian Bell Coventry & North Warwickshire, Knowle & Dorridge
 Joey Benjamin Mitchells & Butlers
 David Brown
 Usman Afzaal
 Dougie Brown Barnt Green
 Freddie Calthorpe
 Nobby Clark West Bromwich Dartmouth
 Geoff Cook
 Nick Cook West Bromwich Dartmouth
 Tim Curtis Kidderminster, West Bromwich Dartmouth
 Steve Davies Himley, Kidderminster
 Phil DeFreitas Aston Manor
 Basil D'Oliveira Kidderminster
 Tom Dollery
 Jack Flavell Stourbridge, Walsall
 Frank Foster
 Reginald "Tip" Foster Stourbridge
 Alfred "Tich" Freeman
 Bruce French
 Jason Gallian Wolverhampton
 Norman Gifford Dudley
 Tom Goddard
 Alf Gover West Bromwich Dartmouth
 Tom Graveney Dudley
 Dean Headley Old Hill
 Eddie Hemmings
 Graeme Hick Kidderminster
 Robin Hobbs Duport
 Eric Hollies Old Hill, West Bromwich Dartmouth
 Martin Horton Stourbridge
 Harry Howell
 Dick Howorth Old Hill, Stourbridge, Walsall
 Geoff Humpage Moseley Ashfield
 Kenneth Hutchings
 Richard Illingworth Barnt Green, Old Elizabethans, Worcester City
 John Jameson
 Roly Jenkins West Bromwich Dartmouth
 Arthur Jones
 Don Kenyon Stourbridge
 Sep Kinneir
 David Larter
 Wayne Larkins Leamington
 Dick Lilley
 Andy Lloyd
 Jim McConnon
 Tim Munton
 Phil Newport Kidderminster Victoria
 Morris Nichols
 Alan Oakman
 George Paine
 Charles Palmer Old Hill
 Reg Perks Dudley, Kidderminster, West Bromwich Dartmouth
 Kevin Pietersen Cannock
 Dick Pollard
 Willie Quaife
 Neal Radford Evesham, Stratford-upon-Avon
 Steve Rhodes
 Dick Richardson Old Hill, Stourbridge
 Peter Richardson Stourbridge
 Fred Root Dudley
 Fred Rumsey Kidderminster
 Frank Smailes
 Gladstone Small Knowle & Dorridge
 Mike Smith
 Neil Smith Leamington
 Peter Smith West Bromwich Dartmouth
 Vikram Solanki Wolverhampton
 David Steele West Bromwich Dartmouth 
 Olly Stone Barnt Green
 Maurice Tate
 Roy Tattersall Kidderminster
 James Taylor Kidderminster Victoria, Shrewsbury
 Les Taylor West Bromwich Dartmouth
 Jonathan Trott Harborne
 Jim Troughton Stratford-upon-Avon
 Abe Waddington West Bromwich Dartmouth
 Arthur Wellard
 David "Butch" White
 Bob Willis
 Chris Woakes Walmley
 Bob Wyatt Moseley

Overseas players

ICC Full Member Nations

Australia
 Greg Matthews Old Hill
 Tom Moody
 Simon O'Donnell
 Chris Rogers Wellington
 Steve Waugh Smethwick
 Graham Yallop Walsall
South Africa
 Peter Carlstein Old Hill
 Allan Donald Knowle & Dorridge
 Clive Eksteen
 JP Fellows-Smith West Bromwich Dartmouth
 Anthonie Ferreira (Unofficial)
 Claude Henderson
 Ryan McLaren Knowle & Dorridge
 Brian McMillan
 Senuran Muthusamy Brockhampton 
 Hugh Page (Unofficial)
 Sid Pegler
 Roy Pienaar Kidderminster
 Dewald Pretorius Moseley
 Mike Rindel Smethwick, West Bromwich Dartmouth
 Herbie Taylor
 Thami Tsolekile Coventry & North Warwickshire
West Indies
 Fabian Allen Worcester 
 Carlos Brathwaite Knowle & Dorridge
 Colin Croft
 Shane Dowrich Leamington Spa
 George Headley
 Ron Headley Dudley, Old Hill, Stourbridge
 Vanburn Holder West Bromwich Dartmouth
 Alvin Kallicharan
 Collis King
Frank King West Bromwich Dartmouth
 Lincoln Roberts Himley
 Alfred Scott West Bromwich Dartmouth
 Phil Simmons Wellington
 Dwayne Smith Kington
 Jerome Taylor Barnards Green
 Alf Valentine
New Zealand
 Ian Butler Harborne
 Stewie Dempster
 Martin Donnelly
 Jamie How Walsall
 Warren Lees
 Bill Merritt
 Jimmy Neesham West Bromwich Dartmouth
 Michael Papps Walsall
 John Parker Kidderminster
 Dipak Patel Dudley, West Bromwich Dartmouth
 Barry Sinclair
 Don Taylor West Bromwich Dartmouth
 Glenn Turner Stourbridge
 Roger Twose West Bromwich Dartmouth
 George Worker Knowle & Dorridge
India
 Sairaj Bahutule Wolverhampton
 Shiv Sunder Das Harborne
 Dilip Doshi Walsall
 Wasim Jaffer Himley
 Amar Singh
Pakistan
 Abid Ali West Bromwich Dartmouth
 Azhar Mahmood Smethwick
 Imran Khan Stourbridge 
 Mohammad Akram Smethwick
 Mohammad Yousuf Smethwick, Evesham
 Mushtaq Mohammad Old Hill
 Saqlain Mushtaq Evesham
 Sadiq Mohammad
 Shahid Saeed Evesham
 Shoaib Akhtar Berkswell
 Wasim Akram Smethwick, Aston Unity
Sri Lanka
 Dinusha Fernando Brockhampton
 Somachandra de Silva West Bromwich Dartmouth
 Champaka Ramanayake West Bromwich Dartmouth
 Malinda Warnapura Halesowen
Zimbabwe
 Tendai Chisoro Fordhouses
 Dion Ebrahim West Bromwich Dartmouth
 Andy Flower West Bromwich Dartmouth
 Grant Flower Barnt Green
 Travis Friend Knowle & Dorridge
 Trevor Garwe Wellington
 David Houghton West Bromwich Dartmouth
 Dougie Marillier Bedworth, Kenilworth Wardens
 Gus Mackay Barnt Green, West Bromwich Dartmouth
 Mpumelelo "Pommie" Mbangwa Coventry & North Warwickshire
 Waddington Mwayenga Worcester
 Edward Rainsford Berkswell
 Paul Strang Barnt Green
 Tatenda Taibu Worcester
 Mark Vermeulen Fordhouses
 Dirk Viljoen Barnt Green
Bangladesh
 Enamul Haque Jr Wolverhampton
Ireland (& England)
 Boyd Rankin Moseley

ICC Associate Nations

Namibia

 Jan-Berry Burger Knowle and Dorridge
 Gerrie Snyman Tamworth, Walsall
 Christi Viljeon Aston Manor 
Netherlands
 Ben Cooper Stratford-upon-Avon
 Tim Gruijters Walmley
Scotland
 Navdeep Poonia Old Hill, West Bromwich Dartmouth 
 Calum MacLeod Walmley

External links
 Official website
 play-cricket website

References

English domestic cricket competitions
1888 establishments in England
Sport in Birmingham, West Midlands
ECB Premier Leagues